The Mexican Figure Skating Championships are a figure skating national championship held annually to determine the national champions of Mexico.

Medalists

Men

Women

Ice dancing

References 

 
Figure skating national championships
Figure skating in Mexico